Atılay Canel (born January 24, 1955) is a Turkish football coach. He served as the head coach of the Turkey women's national football team in 2002. Currently, he coaches the TFF Third League team Maltepespor.

Canel's past teams were Sarıyer G.K. (1986–1987), Pendikspor (1987–1989), Maltepespor (2003–2009) and Kartalspor (2009–2010).

References

1955 births
Sportspeople from Edirne
Turkish football managers
Turkey women's national football team managers
Kartalspor managers
Fatih Karagümrük S.K. managers
Living people